Peter Gross may refer to:

 Peter Alfred Gross (1849–1914), American landscape painter
 Peter Gross (judge), British Court of Appeal judge
 Peter Gross (comics), American comic book writer and artist
 Pete Gross (1936–1992), American sports announcer
 Peter Gros, host of Wild Kingdom
 Peter Grosz, American writer and actor